This article lists the members of the National Assembly of South Africa during the 25th South African Parliament, which sat between 2009 and 2014.

Members were sworn in on 6 May 2009 during the first sitting of the National Assembly after the election on 22 April 2009. The African National Congress (DA) retained their majority, but lost their two-thirds majority. The Democratic Alliance (DA) remained the official opposition. A total of thirteen political parties held seats in the  National Assembly. The term of the National Assembly expired on 6 May 2014, the day before the 2014 general election.

Members 
List of members of the National Assembly, as on 22 January 2014.

Vacancies and replacements
A seat in the National Assembly becomes vacant when the member dies, resigns, ceases to be eligible, membership of the party that nominated them is terminated, or is elected as President of South Africa. The vacancy is filled from the same party list as the former member.

References

Parliament of South Africa